Columbia Point is a high mountain summit of the Crestones in the Sangre de Cristo Range of the Rocky Mountains of North America. The Crestones are a cluster of high summits in the Sangre de Cristo Range, comprising Crestone Peak, Crestone Needle, Kit Carson Peak, Challenger Point, Humboldt Peak, and Columbia Point.

Columbia Point is subpeak of Kit Carson Mountain. It was known informally as Kat Carson, but was officially named Columbia Point in 2003 to honor the seven astronauts who died when the Space Shuttle Columbia disintegrated during re-entry on February 1, 2003.

The Memorial
The USGS Board of Geographic Names approved the name of Columbia Point in June, 2003.  On the weekend of August 7, 2003, a group consisting of family members, astronauts, friends and climbers installed a memorial plaque on the summit.  The trip included a dedication service for the memorial, and an F16 flyby in missing man formation.

The plaque reads:

Historical names
Columbia Point – 2003 
East Summit
Kat Carson Mountain

See also
Challenger Point
Crestones
List of Colorado mountain ranges
List of Colorado mountain summits
List of Colorado fourteeners
List of Colorado 4000 meter prominent summits
List of the most prominent summits of Colorado
List of Colorado county high points

References

External links

Mountains of Colorado
Mountains of Saguache County, Colorado
Mountains of Custer County, Colorado
North American 4000 m summits
Sangre de Cristo Mountains